The Mhadei Wildlife Sanctuary is a 208.5-km2 (80.5-mi2) protected area in the Indian state of Goa in the Western Ghats of South India. It is located in the North Goa District, Sattari taluka near the town of Valpoi. The sanctuary is an area of high biodiversity, and is being considered to become a Project Tiger tiger reserve because of the presence of Bengal tigers.

Infrastructure
The sanctuary is administered by the Goa State Forest Department. The range forest officer of Mhadei Wildlife Sanctuary is Vishwas Chodankar. The RFO office is near the Forest Department office in Valpoi. The sanctuary is protected by 11 forest guards under the supervision of three round foresters. The sanctuary is divided into 16 beats with the three round foresters stationed in Kodal, Charavane and Caranzol in Sattari taluka. The sanctuary office has a four-wheel-drive vehicle and a motorcycle for patrolling.

There are no public tourist facilities in the sanctuary, but there are Forest Department rest houses at Valpoi and Keri. There is an Irrigation Department rest house above the Anjunem Dam.

There are three private ecoresorts in Chorla ghat, the Wildernest Nature Conservation Facility, the Eco Adventure Resort, and the Swapnagandha Resort.

Geography
Goa is the only state in India which has protected the complete Western Ghats' section within a state. The Mahdei Wildlife Sanctuary and Bhagwan Mahaveer Sanctuary and Mollem National Park all fall within the Mhadei River basin. The Mhadei Wildlife Sanctuary is located between 15° 48" 33' to 14° 53" 54' N and 74° 20" 13' to 73° 40" 33' E.

The sanctuary includes the Vagheri Hills, some of the highest peaks in North Goa. Vagheri peak at elevation, the highest in the sanctuary, is near the village of Keri in Sanquelim.

A unique discovery of the Vagheri hills is the presence of a flowing lake or waterbody shaped in the exact map of India, midway to climbing the hill while looking down at the valley.

The Mhadei River, known downstream as the Mandovi River, the lifeline of the state of Goa, originates in Karnataka, travels in Karnataka, passes  through the Mahdei Wildlife Sanctuary and meets the Arabian Sea at Panaji after traveling  in Goa. See map showing rivers in Mhadei Wildlife sanctuary.

Waterfalls
Mhadei Sanctuary is noted for its many waterfalls, especially the twin  Vazra Sakla waterfalls  and the Virdi Falls  in the Chorla Ghats region on the escarpment of the Goa-Maharashtra-Karnataka border in the Swapnagandha valley forest near Virdi village.

Fauna
This region is part of the Western Ghats landscape, and is regarded as a Global Biodiversity Hotspot.

Other mammals seen in the sanctuary include the tiger, Indian black panther (rare), sloth bear (rare, occasional sightings near caves and grasslands), gaur (commonly sighted near the grasslands, in forest clearings, and near water), barking deer (commonly sighted near forest clearings and waterholes), sambar deer (occasionally sighted on grasslands and main roads), leopard (extremely rare), ruddy mongoose (frequently sighted at daybreak and dusk on forest paths), Asian palm civet (commonly sighted on main roads and near village settlements), small Indian civet (commonly sighted on main roads, dhole (rarely sighted transient mammal in the forests), jungle cat (extremely rare, sighted by researchers and locals on a few occasions), mouse deer (rare, occasional sightings on trails), wild boar (frequently sighted at dawn and dusk), Indian hare (commonly sighted on the plateaux), giant squirrel (documented in the forests), flying squirrel (a nocturnal mammal, documented in dense evergreen forests), black-faced langur (commonly found in small groups in the tree canopy), Indian pangolin (rarely found in secondary forests), slender loris (rare and endangered), bonnet macaque (commonly found in troupes).

Mhadei Wildlife Sanctuary is an International Bird Area (IN177) which satisfies IBA criterion: A1. Globally threatened species, A2. Restricted-range species and A3. Biome-restricted species. IBA trigger species here are: Nilgiri wood-pigeon, Malabar parakeet, Malabar grey hornbill, grey-headed bulbul, rufous babbler, white-bellied blue-flycatcher and crimson-backed sunbird. A total of 255 bird species have been recorded in the Sanctuary. Of these, 53 showed direct signs of breeding here.

Snakes found in the Mhadei Valley, including the Mhadei Wildlife Sanctuary, include all of the "Big Four" venomous snakes in India: Indian krait, Russell’s viper, saw-scaled viper, spectacled cobra, plus: banded kukri snake, banded racer, Beddome’s keelback, black slender coral snake, brahminy blind snake, checkered keelback, collared cat snake, common bronzeback, common Indian cat snake, common sand boa, common wolf snake, common vine snake, copper-headed trinket snake, green pit viper, hump-nosed pit viper, Indian rat snake, Indian rock python, king cobra, Malabar pit viper,  ocellated shield tail, ornate flying snake, red sand boa, Sri Lankan cat snake, streaked Kukri snake, striped keelback, Travancore wolf snake, tree snake, Whitaker's sand boa and the yellow-spotted wolf snake.

Endemic species of amphibians in the sanctuary include the endangered marbled ramanella, the vulnerable Maharashtra bush frog, Beddome's leaping frog (Beddome’s Indian frog) and Malabar gliding frog.

Mhadei area is known for three rare species of caecilians (legless amphibians), Nadkarni's caecilian, the Mhadei caecilian and the Goa caecilian which was recently discovered and described from Keri village.

At least 257 recorded species of butterflies are found in the sanctuary of the 330 recorded species in the Western Ghats. The largest butterfly in South India, the southern birdwing plus the striped tiger, common jezebel, common Indian crow, blue Mormon and other species of butterflies can are found here. Prominent among these is the blue tiger butterfly, which can be found until the summer.

Flora

Sacred groves
Sacred groves were once common at almost all villages in Sattari. They traditionally render protection to a variety of flora and fauna. Copardem, three kilometres from Valpoi, is a village famed for the sacred grove tradition known locally as Devachi rai, a tradition of community conservation carried out in the name of the local deity. Formerly spread across  of government land, much of the sacred grove is now encroached upon for cashew plantations and agriculture. The sacred grove is an excellent example of the old tradition of uneducated villagers protecting their environment.

Among its variety of flora are towering trees such as shidam (Tetrameles nudiflora) which support various other life forms in the grove. Creepers like garkani (Entada scandens) with their sword-like pods are found on the shidam, while the tree also houses beehives. The grove also has an evergreen species of Ashoka, which bears unique saffron-coloured flowers. Pandanus furcatus, known locally known as kegadi, attracts village women when it bears flowers covered in yellow and soft thickets. During the monsoon, bioluminescent fungi growing on dead wood glitter at night. The grove is also conducive for the growth of a variety of edible mushrooms, such as roen alami, khutyali, sonyali and shringar.

In addition to mammals, the tall trees attract birds, including the crested serpent eagle, Malabar grey hornbill and pied hornbill.

Nanoda village,  from Valpoi, has an ancient tradition of nature worship. It is etymologically related to the naked woman tree, locally known as the nano (Euphorbia tirucalli - pencil tree). Ancestors who lived in harmony with nature evolved the tradition of protecting the forest in honour of the local deity. Nanoda has two sacred groves named Nirankarachi Rai after the holy spirit Nirankar: one lies on the border of Maloli and Nanoda and the other in Nanoda.

The latter is slowly being weathered away by changing values and encroachments. In the past, large areas of forest land were protected through sacred groves such as Nirankarachi Rai. One would find various species of indigenous trees in these groves and no one dared cut a tree. In this way, villagers ensured their protection. The densely forested groves were also used by villagers to keep sculptures of village deities. Today, because of encroachments, the size of the groves has decreased, while the sculptures lie exposed to the vagaries of nature. Nanoda's Nirankarachi Rai, formerly spread across a large area, is now confined to a small patch where the vulnerable species hedu (satinwood), khait (Mimosa catechu), and chafara (red frangipani) trees are found. Majestic trees such as bhillo maad (coconut) have already been felled.

Inside the sacred grove are 15 stone sculptures-of Gajlaxmi, Mahishasurmardini, Ravalnath, Brahmani, a horse rider and warriors-which are a part of Goa's archaeological heritage, weathering away. Animals such as sheryo (pangolin) and shekaro (Malabar giant squirrel) are found in sacred groves.

Threats
Threats to the unique ecology and biodiversity of the Mhedai Wildlife Sanctuary include illegal heavy vehicular traffic mismanagement of private lands, illegal mining, tree-felling, monoculture plantations, industrial activities, poaching, and dams and river diversions, notably the Malaprabha Reservoir Project and The Kalasa-Banduri Nala project.

Mhadei tiger reserve

Proposal
On 20 June 2011, Jairam Ramesh, Minister of State, Ministry of Environment and Forests, advised Digambar Kamat, Chief Minister of Goa, to propose the Mhadei Wildlife Sanctuary as a tiger reserve because of the presence of resident Bengal tigers. The MOEF urged Goa to seriously consider the proposal because Mhadei is a 'contiguous tiger landscape' to Bhimgad Wildlife Sanctuary in Karnataka to its southeast and to Anshi Dandeli Tiger Reserve which has around 35 tigers to its southeast in Karnataka. Ramesh noted that the protected areas of Goa and their contiguous forests in Karnataka and Maharashtra are possibly some of the best tiger habitats in the Western Ghats and are in need of protection. Tigers are a conservation dependent species. He suggested expanding the tiger reserve beyond the existing Mhadei Wildlife Sanctuary.

On 8 August 2011, Goa Forests Minister Filipe Neri Rodrigues questioned the existence of tigers in the state. "It is not my job to know whether there are any tigers here." Rodrigues also said, "the state government would not reply to a directive from former union environment and forests minister minister Jairam Ramesh asking the Goa government to submit a proposal for setting up a tiger reserve, unless specifically asked for. Why should we reply?" It is alleged that the Goa government's sluggishness to acknowledge the presence of tigers in Goa is linked to the state's Rs. 6,500 crore (US$ ~13,000,000.) mining industry, which rings the Western Ghats and most of the tiger terrain near the Mhadei Wildlife Sanctuary.

On 9 August 2011, there was public announcement that "in principle" approval was accorded by the National Tiger Conservation Authority for creation of a new tiger reserve at Mhadei Sanctuary. Under section 38V of the Wildlife Protection Act of 1972 the Goa state government was then authorised to notify Mhadei Wildlife Sanctuary as a tiger reserve.

There is considerable local community support for creation of the tiger reserve which would ensure long term protection of biodiversity-rich areas. In September, 2011, the Save Goa Campaign - UK initiated a petition addressed to The Goa Principal Chief Conservator of Forests, Dr. Shashi Kumar, IFS, in support of Goa's first tiger reserve.

Tiger presence
The contiguous forests of Goa, Karnataka and Maharashtra including the wildlife sanctuaries of Goa in the Mhadei river valley, the Anshi Tiger Reserve and the reserve forests and wildlife sanctuary of Radhanagari in Karnataka, Chandoli National Park and the reserve forests of Purna and Dodamarg in Maharashtra have been named as Tiger Conservation Units (TCU) numbers 68 to 72,  class: II (minimum habitat area to support 50 tigers or documented evidence of 50 tigers) and III (some information on threats and conservation measures is available, but not classified as Class I or II) by WWFInternational.

The Mhadei region lies along the Vagheri hills which means "abode of tiger". In 2011, a map showing the locations of several tiger sightings in and near Mhedai Wildlife sanctuary was prepared by the Vivekanand Environment Awareness Brigade (VEAB) at Keri.

On 24 January 2011 government officials and a senior environmentalist found pugmarks of a tiger adult and a cub near the Anjunem dam, confirming the presence of tiger in the area. Parshuram Kambli, working on the dam first reported the pugmarks. Residents living near the dam supported the claim, stating they have been hearing the tiger roar in the past fortnight. In December 2010, a local resident, Pandurang Gawas, and his son saw a tiger and cub crossing the road that passes alongside the dam. Also in 2011, the Goa Forest Department recorded tiger pug marks in this area during the Goa Wildlife Census conducted with the help of Dehradun-based Wildlife Institute of India (WII).

The 2010 National Tiger Conservation Authority tiger estimation described the Goa stretch of the Western Ghats as an important tiger corridor between Anshi-Dandeli Tiger Reserve in Karnataka and the Sahyadris in Maharashtra, and confirmed occupancy of tigers in the state’s forests. In October, 2009 poachers were arrested near Mhadei with a tiger carcass and in recent years a live adult female tiger with a cub was sighted in the area.

The staff of the Wildernest Resort at Chorla Ghat also sighted a tiger in the region in 2009. Also in the Chorla Ghat area, a part of the Mhadei Wildlife Sanctuary, there was a confirmed kill of a female domestic buffalo by an adult male tiger. Confirmation of the presence of a male tiger came to light after villagers from Chorla and surrounding areas reported sightings and viewed pugmarks in several locations in the Chorla Ghats.

In May 2019, camera traps recorded tigers in this sanctuary and Mollem National Park, the first records in the state since 2013.

References

External sources

 Centre asks Goa for tiger reserve proposal again 15-8-2012
Bhimagad forest is now wildlife sanctuary, 12-2-2011
Map showing National Parks and Wildlife Sanctuaries in Goa
Map

Wildlife sanctuaries in Goa
Wildlife sanctuaries of the Western Ghats
Tiger reserves of India
1999 establishments in Goa
Geography of North Goa district
Tourist attractions in North Goa district
Protected areas established in 1999